Salvatore Monaco (born 15 August 1992) is an Italian footballer who plays as a defender for  club Padova.

Club career
He made his professional debut in the Lega Pro for Grosseto on 8 November 2014 in a game against Savona.

On 31 July 2019, he joined Cosenza on loan.

On 6 August 2021, he joined to Padova as a free agent.

References

External links
 

1992 births
Living people
Footballers from Naples
Italian footballers
Association football defenders
Serie B players
Serie C players
Serie D players
Casale F.B.C. players
Taranto F.C. 1927 players
F.C. Grosseto S.S.D. players
S.S. Arezzo players
A.C. Perugia Calcio players
U.S. Salernitana 1919 players
Cosenza Calcio players
Calcio Padova players